142nd (Durham) Heavy Battery was a unit of Britain's Royal Garrison Artillery (RGA) formed during World War I from coast defence gunners of the Durham Royal Garrison Artillery. It served on the Western Front, including the Battles of Vimy Ridge, Passchendaele, the Lys, and the Allied Hundred Days Offensive in 1918.

Mobilisation

In the years before World War I, the Royal Garrison Artillery (RGA) had been responsible for the coast defence artillery of the United Kingdom, with Regular Army units supplemented by the 'defended port units' of the part-time Territorial Force. These included the Durham RGA at West Hartlepool, manning the Tees and Hartlepool coastal guns with a mobile heavy battery at Sunderland. The Durham RGA was the only British coast defence unit to engage the enemy during the war, when the Imperial German Navy bombarded Hartlepool and Scarborough on 16 December 1914.

On the outbreak of war, TF units had been invited to volunteer for Overseas Service and on 15 August 1914, the War Office (WO) issued instructions to separate those men who had signed up for Home Service only, and form these into reserve units. On 31 August, the formation of a reserve or 2nd Line unit was authorised for each 1st Line unit where 60 per cent or more of the men had volunteered for Overseas Service. The titles of these 2nd Line units would be the same as the original, but distinguished by a '2/' prefix. In this way duplicate brigades, companies and batteries were created. By the autumn of 1914, the campaign on the Western Front was bogging down into Trench warfare and there was an urgent need for batteries of heavy and siege artillery to be sent to France. The WO authorised 1st line TF RGA companies that had volunteered for overseas service to increase their strength by 50 per cent.

142nd (Durham) Heavy Battery, RGA, was authorised on 31 October 1915 and formed from 1/1st and 2/1st Heavy Batteries of the Durham RGA at Sunderland. It was one of one of only two all-TF heavy field batteries raised from defended ports units.

Service
The 4-gun battery joined 41st Heavy Brigade, RGA, which formed at Woolwich on 25 February 1916 and mobilised four days later. The brigade embarked at Southampton for the Western Front on 21 March 1916. Officially, RGA brigades became 'Heavy Artillery Groups' (HAGs) from 2 April 1916. By 20 April, 41st HAG had joined Second Army in the Ypres sector, where low-level trench warfare was constant.

On 31 July the battery transferred to 55th HAG, which had just arrived from Southampton. This group then joined 'Reserve Army' (shortly to become Fifth Army) fighting in the Somme offensive, where the 60-pounder guns of the heavy batteries were called upon for counter-battery (CB) fire.

Earlier in the year the War Office had decided that four-gun heavy batteries should be increased to six guns. This was done for 142nd Hvy Bty on 5 October 1916 when it was joined by a section from 176th Hvy Bty.

Vimy Ridge

Fifth Army kept hammering away on the Somme front until November, and continued with Operations on the Ancre, January–March 1917. 142nd Heavy Bty was then sent on 21 March to join 76th HAG in the north with First Army, arriving on 25 March. First Army was preparing for the forthcoming Arras Offensive, beginning with an effective CB programme beginning in early April. 76th HAG was positioned north of Bois de Berthonval, supporting Canadian Corps, which was to carry out the opening attack on Vimy Ridge. Maximum use was made of observation balloons and aircraft, when weather permitted, to pinpoint opposing batteries for the heavies. The ruling principle was that isolated enemy batteries should be dealt with first, since those that were closely grouped could be more easily and economically neutralised with high explosive and gas shell just before the assault. Huge amounts of ammunition were stockpiled before the operation, including 10,000 rounds for the nine 60-pdr batteries with Canadian Corps specifically to meet possible counter-attacks. After the preparatory fire, the bombardment began on 7 April, ending with a 'hurricane' bombardment at 05.30 on 9 April simultaneously with the attack. 'The artillery attack was a brilliant success. The German artillery was largely destroyed, and what was not was effectively neutralised'. Canadian Corps succeeded in taking almost all its objectives on the first day, and Vimy Ridge with its magnificent observation over enemy territory was in Allied hands.

Ypres

The Arras offensive continued for several weeks. On 22 April, 142nd Hvy Bty transferred to 44th (South African) HAG. At the end of June, the battery moved back to Fifth Army, now at Ypres preparing for the Flanders Offensive (the Third Battle of Ypres). 142nd Heavy Bty did not stay under Fifth Army long: it briefly joined 14th HAG on 29 June, then 4th on 1 July, but moved to 59th HAG with Third Army on 6 July. It therefore missed the early stages of the offensive. It came under 39th HAG on 9 August, but then on 1 September it rejoined Fifth Army with 65th HAG. The offensive was re-launched with the Battle of the Menin Road Ridge (20 September), followed by the battles of Polygon Wood (26 September), Broodseinde (4 October), Poelcappelle (9 October) and finally the First and Second Battle of Passchendaele (12 and 26 October). Conditions for the artillery were by now very bad: British batteries were clearly observable from the Passchendaele Ridge and suffered badly from CB fire, while their own guns sank into the mud and became difficult to aim and fire. The fighting died down after 10 November.

Spring Offensive

142nd Heavy Bty transferred to 79th HAG on 18 December 1917. By now HAG allocations were becoming more fixed, and on 1 February 1918 they were converted into permanent RGA brigades. 142nd Heavy Bty remained with 79th Bde until the end of the war. When it joined, the brigade was part of Second Army in the northern part of the Ypres Salient, but on 22 December, Fourth Army HQ took over from Second. It reverted to Second Army before the German spring offensive began on 21 March 1918.

Second Army was hit by the second phase of the Spring Offensive, the Battle of the Lys, starting on 10 April. When it became clear that the army would have to retire, the heaviest guns were sent away first, but 60-pdrs remained for CB work when good targets were detected. They moved last, and remained with the field artillery firing in support of the hard-pressed infantry. By the night of 21/22 April the situation in front of the Forêt de Nieppe had stabilised. The Germans began nightly bombardments with mustard gas shells to drive 5th Division out. However the division had strong artillery support including 79th Bde RGA, which replied vigorously to the attack, bombarding the German billets and gun positions each night, and continuing harassing fire (HF) shoots throughout the day. The German offensive on this front ended on 29 April.

79th Brigade had shifted to First Army by 1 May, and on 28 June it supported XI Corps in Operation Borderland, a limited counter-attack on La Becque and other fortified farms in front of the Forest of Nieppe, in what was described as 'a model operation' for artillery cooperation. 79th Brigade then transferred with XI Corps to the command of the reconstituted Fifth Army on 1 July 1918.

Hundred Days Offensive

79th Brigade joined the reconstituted Fourth Army on 18 August, soon after the beginning of the final Allied Hundred Days Offensive that lasted to the end of the war. By the end of September Fourth Army had closed up to the Hindenburg Line. On 29 September IX Corps carried out an assault crossing of the St Quentin Canal, with 79th Bde amongst the mass of artillery supporting the operation. The canal defences had largely been destroyed by the heavy guns, which continued firing on the canal banks until the last possible moment as 137th (Staffordshire) Brigade stormed the outpost line and then scrambled across the canal in the morning mist. The objectives were taken by 15.30. 79th Brigade moved its battery positions forward during the night of 30 September/1 October.

On 8 October, IX Corps attacked the next German defensive position, the Beaurevoir Line. Harassing fire had been carried out on the night of 6/7 October, and all through 7 October and up to Zero the heavies carried out CB fire and shelled important localities. Once the attack went in the heavies continued intense CB and long-range HF fire until the infantry were on the objective. On 11 October preparations began for IX Corps' assault on the German line along the River Selle. CB fire began on 13 October, but mist and rain disrupted air reconnaissance on 15 and 16 October. However, Zero for the Battle of the Selle was fixed on 16 October for 05.20 the next day. The first day of the battle went well, one German counter-attack being broken up when all available guns were turned onto it, but the attackers were still short of their objective, the Sambre Canal. Steady progress was also made on the second and third days as Fourth Army closed up to the canal.

IX Corps renewed its advance on 23 October, with 79th Bde part of a massive corps artillery reserve. The attack went in at 01.20 in moonlight, after the heavy guns had done the usual CB and HF bombardments, and the results were extremely satisfactory. As the regimental historian relates, 'The guns of Fourth Army demonstrated, on 23 October, the crushing effect of well co-ordinated massed artillery. they simply swept away the opposition'. After a pause to regroup and reconnoitre, IX Corps stormed across the canal on 4 November (the Battle of the Sambre). After that the campaign became a pursuit of a beaten enemy, in which the slow-moving heavy guns could play little part. The war ended with the Armistice with Germany on 11 November.

After its return to the UK the battery was disbanded at Sandling in Kent on 11 October 1919.

Footnotes

Notes

References

 Maj A.F. Becke,History of the Great War: Order of Battle of Divisions, Part 2b: The 2nd-Line Territorial Force Divisions (57th–69th), with the Home-Service Divisions (71st–73rd) and 74th and 75th Divisions, London: HM Stationery Office, 1937/Uckfield: Naval & Military Press, 2007, ISBN 1-847347-39-8.
 Maj A.F. Becke,History of the Great War: Order of Battle of Divisions, Part 4: The Army Council, GHQs, Armies, and Corps 1914–1918, London: HM Stationery Office, 1944/Uckfield: Naval & Military Press, 2007, ISBN 1-847347-43-6.
 Gregory Blaxland, Amiens: 1918, London: Frederick Muller, 1968/Star, 1981, ISBN 0-352-30833-8.
 Brig-Gen Sir James E. Edmonds, History of the Great War: Military Operations, France and Belgium 1918, Vol II, March–April: Continuation of the German Offensives, London: Macmillan, 1937/Imperial War Museum and Battery Press, 1995, ISBN 1-87042394-1/Uckfield: Naval & Military Press, 2009, ISBN 978-1-84574-726-8.
 Brig-Gen Sir James E. Edmonds, History of the Great War: Military Operations, France and Belgium 1918, Vol III, May–July: The German Diversion Offensives and the First Allied Counter-Offensive, London: Macmillan, 1939/Imperial War Museum and Battery Press, 1994, ISBN 0-89839-211-X/Uckfield: Naval & Military Press, 2009, ISBN 978-1-84574-727-5.
 Brig-Gen Sir James E. Edmonds & Lt-Col R. Maxwell-Hyslop, History of the Great War: Military Operations, France and Belgium 1918, Vol V, 26th September–11th November, The Advance to Victory, London: HM Stationery Office, 1947/Imperial War Museum and Battery Press, 1993, ISBN 1-870423-06-2.
 Capt Cyril Falls, History of the Great War: Military Operations, France and Belgium 1917, Vol I, The German Retreat to the Hindenburg Line and the Battle of Arras, London: Macmillan, 1940/London: Imperial War Museum & Battery Press/Uckfield: Naval and Military Press, 2009, ISBN 978-1-84574722-0.
 Gen Sir Martin Farndale, History of the Royal Regiment of Artillery: Western Front 1914–18, Woolwich: Royal Artillery Institution, 1986, ISBN 1-870114-00-0.
 Gen Sir Martin Farndale, History of the Royal Regiment of Artillery: The Forgotten Fronts and the Home Base 1914–18, Woolwich: Royal Artillery Institution, 1988, ISBN 1-870114-05-1.
 J.B.M. Frederick, Lineage Book of British Land Forces 1660–1978, Vol II, Wakefield: Microform Academic, 1984, ISBN 1-85117-009-X.
 H.A. Jones, The War in the Air, Vol III, Oxford: Clarendon Press, 1931/London: Imperial War Museum and Battery Press, 1998, ISBN 1-90162326-2.
 Norman E.H. Litchfield, The Territorial Artillery 1908–1988 (Their Lineage, Uniforms and Badges), Nottingham: Sherwood Press, 1992, ISBN 0-9508205-2-0.
 War Office, Instructions Issued by The War Office During August 1914, London: HM Stationery Office.
 War Office, Instructions Issued by The War Office During September 1914, London: HM Stationery Office.
 War Office, Instructions Issued by The War Office During October 1914, London: HM Stationery Office.

Heavy batteries of the Royal Garrison Artillery
Military units and formations established in 1915
Military units and formations disestablished in 1919
Military units and formations in County Durham
Military units and formations in Sunderland
Artillery units and formations of World War I